Race: Bubba Wallace is a 2022 Netflix docuseries about the American professional stock car racing driver Bubba Wallace.

Episodes

References

External links
 
 

2022 American television series debuts
2020s American black television series
2020s American documentary television series
African Americans and sport
American sports television series
Documentary television series about sports
English-language Netflix original programming
NASCAR on television
Netflix original documentary television series
Racism in television
Works about men
Works about sportspeople